Luis Antonio Gokim Tagle (born June 21, 1957) is a Filipino prelate of the Catholic Church currently serving as the Pro-Prefect for the Section of Evangelization of Dicastery for Evangelization (formerly the Congregation for the Evangelization of Peoples) since June 5, 2022, and as the President of Interdicasterial Commission for Consecrated Religious since December 8, 2019. He was the 32nd Archbishop of Manila from 2011 to 2019. Tagle is the Cardinal-Bishop of San Felice da Cantalice a Centocelle (pro hac vice) and also serves as the President of the Catholic Biblical Federation, Grand Chancellor of the Pontifical Urbaniana University, and as a member of various departments and dicasteries in the Roman Curia.

Tagle, who generally prefers to be called by his nickname "Chito" rather than by his clerical title, has been involved in many social issues in the Philippines, with emphasis on helping the poor while defending the Catholic Church's opposition to abortion, contraception, and what he has called "practical atheism". Dubbed as the "Asian Francis", he is often seen as a representative of the Catholic Church's progressive wing. Tagle has criticized the Catholic Church for using "harsh words" to describe LGBT as well as divorced and remarried Catholics, whom he believes should be allowed to receive Holy Communion on a case-by-case basis.

Early life and studies
Tagle was born on June 21, 1957, the eldest child of devout Catholic parents, Manuel Topacio Tagle, an ethnic Tagalog and his Chinese Filipino wife, Milagros Gokim, who previously worked for Equitable PCI Bank.

Tagle's paternal grandfather, Florencio, came from Imus, Cavite; the Tagle family were from the Spanish, lowland Christian aristocracy known as the Principalía, which were the elite prior to the 1896 Philippine Revolution. Florencio was injured by a bomb explosion during the Second World War; Tagle's grandmother made a living by running a local diner.

After completing elementary and high school at Saint Andrew's School in Parañaque, Rizal in 1973, he was influenced by priest friends to enter the Jesuit San José Seminary, which sent him to the Jesuit Ateneo de Manila University.

Tagle earned a Bachelor of Arts degree in pre-divinity from Ateneo in 1977 and then a Master of Arts in theology at its Loyola School of Theology. Tagle earned his Doctorate in Sacred Theology at the Catholic University of America from 1987 to 1991. He wrote his dissertation under the direction of Joseph A. Komonchak on "Episcopal Collegiality in the Teaching and Practice of Paul VI". Tagle also attended doctrinal courses at the Institute of Pope Paul VI University. In Komonchak's estimation, Tagle was "one of the best students I had in over 40 years of teaching" and "could have become the best theologian in the Philippines, or even in all of Asia" had he not been appointed bishop. Tagle has received honorary degrees from Catholic Theological Union and La Salle University. Tagle is fluent in speaking his native Tagalog language, as well as the English and Italian languages. He is also proficient in reading Spanish, French, Korean and Latin.

Priesthood
Tagle was ordained in the Diocese of Imus on February 27, 1982. After ordination, he held the following positions: associate pastor of San Agustín Parish – Méndez-Núñez, Cavite (1982–1984), spiritual director (1982–1983) and later rector (1983–1985) of the diocesan seminary of Imus. After studies in the United States from 1985 to 1992, he returned to Imus and was Episcopal Vicar for Religious (1993–1995) and parish priest and rector (1998–2001) of Nuestra Señora del Pilar Cathedral-Parish. He also taught theology at San Carlos Seminary (1982-1985) and Divine Word Seminary in Tagaytay.

Pope John Paul II appointed Tagle to the International Theological Commission, where he served from 1997 to 2002 under its President, Cardinal Joseph Ratzinger. From 1995 to 2001, he was a member of the editorial board of the "History of Vatican II" project.

Bishop of Imus
In 2001, Tagle was appointed Bishop of Imus on October 22 and consecrated on December 12 after previously serving as parish priest of the Cathedral-parish of Imus. During his ten years in Imus, he made a point of living simply, owned no car, and invited the destitute to join him for a meal. At the first gathering of bishops under Pope Benedict XVI in 2005, the General Assembly of the Synod of Bishops, he spoke from the floor about the inadequacy of the number of priests in the Philippines. He said:

To the concept that priestly vocation are a gift from God he countered: "we should also ask whether the Church is a good steward of the gift." He told a news conference that "The first Sunday after my ordination as a priest, I said nine Masses, and that is regular in the Philippines." Discussing priestly celibacy, Cardinal Angelo Scola, the synod moderator, expressed reservations about modifications to the Church's requirement of celibacy for the priesthood. In response, Tagle suggested that the Church should consider such a change to combat the shortage of priests.

At the 2008 International Eucharistic Congress in Quebec, Canada, he delivered a talk on the importance of the Eucharist that, by one report, moved the audience to tears. He contrasted Christian worship with false forms of adoration:

Archbishop of Manila

Pope Benedict XVI appointed Tagle the 32nd Archbishop of Manila on October 13, 2011, to succeed Cardinal Gaudencio Rosales. According to Fr. Catalino Arévalo, SJ, the first Asian member of the Vatican's International Theological Commission, Tagle's appointment was promoted by the Papal Nuncio to the Philippines Edward Joseph Adams and by Cardinal Gaudencio Rosales, but some objections were submitted to the Congregation for Bishops, which caused some delay in processing his appointment. Prior to his installation, Tagle made a pilgrimage to the Holy Land in October 2011. He was installed as Archbishop on December 12, 2011, the feast day of Our Lady of Guadalupe and the tenth anniversary of his episcopal consecration. He received the pallium, the symbol of his authority as a metropolitan archbishop, from Pope Benedict XVI on June 29, 2012, in Rome.
In February 2012, Tagle attended the Symposium for Healing and Renewal at the Pontifical Gregorian University in Rome. Tagle discussed the way the sex-abuse crisis manifests itself in Asia, where it is more common for priests to violate their vows of celibacy by taking mistresses than to engage in the sexual abuse of minors. Tagle maintained that the deference to authority typical of Asian culture combined with the dominance of the Catholic Church in a country like the Philippines produced a "culture of shame" that continued to inhibit the reporting of instances of abuse. He said that culture needed to change though he anticipated great difficulties:

He said the fact his country had a "touching culture" that created problems of interpretation and mandatory reporting laws would face cultural hurdles as well.

On June 12, 2012, Tagle was appointed a member of the Congregation for Catholic Education for a five-year renewable term. That same day, Tagle spoke at the 50th International Eucharistic Congress in Dublin, Ireland. He discussed how the sexual abuse crisis requires the Catholic Church to reevaluate its relationship with the media. He said: "As we challenge them to be fair and truthful in whatever they are reporting, the Church should also be prepared to be scrutinised by media, provided the norms of fairness and truthfulness are applied to all, especially the victims." He decried the tendency of church officials to resent negative media coverage even when accurate, while noting he had witnessed some media coverage in Asia that is tainted by "an anti-Christian sentiment." He also mentioned the various issues which distinguish the experience of the Church in Ireland and similar cases in Asia.

On August 4, 2012, Tagle delivered a speech at a prayer rally against the Reproductive Health Bill, which included provisions for the funding and distribution of birth control information and devices; contraception is customarily considered abortion in the Philippines. He advocated for the recognition of women's rights by recognizing their valued role as mothers and wives, deserving of genuine love and respect as reflections of God and a gift to mankind. Tagle also denounced sexual prostitution as an affront to women's femininity. He took a more moderate stance on the legislation than other Philippine bishops, refusing to threaten politicians who supported the legislation with excommunication or to have posters criticizing its supporters as "Team Death"  distributed in Manila's parishes.

Benedict XVI named Tagle as one of the Synod Fathers for the Synod of Bishops on the New Evangelisation on September 18, 2012. In his intervention at that synod, he outlined how he believed the church should approach the process of evangelization. He said: 

In an interview with Vatican Radio, he explained how his view reflected the experience of Asian and Philippine culture:

He served as archbishop of Manila until December 8, 2019 when he was appointed Prefect of the Congregation for the Evangelization of Peoples. He became the apostolic administrator of the metropolitan see until February 9, 2020. Auxiliary Bishop Broderick Pabillo temporarily administered the Archdiocese as apostolic administrator from February 10, 2020. On March 25, 2021, Pope Francis named Capiz Archbishop Jose Cardinal Advincula to succeed Tagle as Archbishop of Manila.

Cardinal
Pope Benedict XVI announced he was elevating Archbishop Tagle to the College of Cardinals on October 24, 2012. Tagle himself had been notified the night before. At that consistory, he was assigned the titular church of San Felice da Cantalice a Centocelle. Tagle was the seventh Filipino to be made a cardinal of the Catholic Church. When he became a cardinal he was the second youngest one. On December 1, 2012, upon his return to the Philippines, he presided at a thanksgiving Mass at the San Fernando de Dilao Church in Paco, Manila, which President Benigno Aquino III, Vice-President Jejomar Binay, and Mayor Alfredo Lim of Manila attended.

On January 31, 2013, Pope Benedict XVI appointed Cardinal Tagle to serve as a member of the Presidential Committee of the Pontifical Council for the Family and the Pontifical Council for the Pastoral Care of Migrants and Itinerants.

Tagle was mentioned by some news organizations as a possible candidate for election as pope during the papal conclave that elected Pope Francis in 2013.

Tagle led the National Consecration to the Immaculate Heart of Mary at the San Fernando de Dilao Church on June 8, 2013.

In a March 2015 interview, Tagle said the Catholic Church needed to develop a new language for addressing homosexuals, unwed mothers, and divorced and remarried Catholics because "what constituted in the past an acceptable way of showing mercy" changes and needs to be re-imagined. He said:

Following the publication of Pope Francis' encyclical Laudato si', Cardinal Tagle launched a campaign in the Philippines to collect signatures for a petition against anthropogenic global warming caused by carbon dioxide emissions.

As the Synod on the Family opened public discussion of allowing divorced and remarried Catholics to receive communion, Tagle said he was open to hearing arguments on the question. He said: "We have a principle we have to believe in. But the openness comes on pastoral judgments you have to make in concrete situations, because no two cases are alike." As the 2014 session of the synod approached he said he hoped that "the pastoral care of divorced and civilly remarried couples is debated openly and with good will," but emphasized other challenges drawn from his Philippine experience, especially the separation of married couples from one another and their children caused by poverty and migration. After the synod, he said:

In 2015, he said that "Every situation for those who are divorced and remarried is quite unique. To have a general rule might be counterproductive in the end. ...We cannot give one formula for all."

Cardinal Tagle is a member of the Congregation for Catholic Education, Congregation for the Evangelization of Peoples, Pontifical Council for the Family, Pontifical Council for the Pastoral Care of Migrants and Itinerant People, Congregation for Institutes of Consecrated Life and Societies of Apostolic Life, Pontifical Council for the Laity, and XIII Ordinary Council of the Secretariat General of the Synod of Bishops. On July 11, 2015, he was made a member of the Pontifical Council 'Cor Unum'. He was also confirmed by Pope Francis as President of the Catholic Biblical Federation on March 5, 2015. On May 14, 2015, he was elected President of Caritas International replacing Cardinal Oscar Rodriguez Maradiaga. Ross Douthat criticized Tagle's appointment in the publication First Things.

Tagle has been Chairman for the Episcopal Commission on the Doctrine of Faith of the Philippines since 2003. Tagle is the Professor of Dogmatic Synthesis at the Graduate School of Theology of San Carlos Seminary, the archdiocesan major seminary of Manila, and an Associate Professor of Systematic Theology at the Loyola School of Theology of Ateneo de Manila University. He also taught at the school of theology of the Divine Word Seminary in Tagaytay.

Roman Curia

On November 30, 2013, Cardinal Tagle was named member of the Congregation for Catholic Education. He was then named member of the Congregation for the Institutes of Consecrated Life and the Societies of Apostolic Life on March 29, 2014.

Pope Francis named Tagle Prefect of the Congregation for the Evangelization of Peoples on December 8, 2019. Tagle is the second Asian to head that Congregation, following Cardinal Ivan Dias, who was prefect from 2006 to 2011. He is the second Filipino cardinal to lead a congregation of the Roman Curia after Jose Tomas Sanchez, who headed the Congregation for the Clergy from 1991 to 1996. In March 2020, Philippine President Rodrigo Duterte said the Pope had removed Tagle from his post in Manila for channeling church funds to the President's political opponents. The Catholic Bishops' Conference of the Philippines (CBCP) and many individual Philippine prelates denounced Duterte's charge.

Pope Francis promoted him to highest rank of cardinal, Cardinal-Bishop, on May 1, 2020; he is the first Filipino to be included in that rank of the College of Cardinals, and he was promoted Cardinal-Bishop but was not appointed to a suburbicarian see just like Cardinals Parolin, Sandri, Ouelet and Filoni, a break with tradition and Canon Law Section 350.

On June 19, 2020, the Pope named him member of the Pontifical Council for the Legislative Texts. On July 8, 2020, the Pope named him member of the Pontifical Council for Inter-religious Dialogue.

On September 10, 2020, Tagle tested positive for COVID-19 upon his arrival in Manila. He was the first head of a Vatican dicastery, as well as the fifth Filipino bishop, to test positive for COVID-19. He had tested negative for the virus in Rome on September 7. He was asymptomatic and was in isolation. Tagle remained asymptomatic and ended his quarantine on September 23. On September 21, 2020, he was named member of the Cardinalial Commission of the Institute for the Works of Religion (IOR).

On February 22, 2021, Tagle was appointed by Pope Francis as a new member of the Administration of the Patrimony of the Holy See. On June 9, 2021, the pope named him member of the Congregation for the Oriental Churches. On June 1, 2022, the pope named him member of the Congregation for Divine Worship and the Discipline of the Sacraments.

Currently, Cardinal Tagle was appointed as the Pro-prefect for the Section of Evangelization of the Dicastery for Evangelization. Due to the enforcement of the Apostolic Constitution Praedicate Evangelium on June 05, 2022, many changes have been made to the Roman Curia. The new Dicastery of Evangelization was formed as a merger of the Congregation for the Evangelization of Peoples and the Pontifical Council for Promoting the New Evangelization. According to the new apostolic constitution, this new dicastery is directly headed by the Supreme Pontiff as its Prefect, while being assisted with two pro-prefects, one of which is Cardinal Tagle.

Coat of arms

The updated coat of arms of the Cardinal retained all the essential elements found in the sinister side of his coat of arms as Archbishop of Manila. Now that he is no longer the incumbent Ordinary, the coat of arms of the Archdiocese is no longer depicted.

The coat of arms has adopted a different marshalling (division) in order to arrange the achievements in the shield (elements) in a heraldically correct manner.

The coat of arms is parted tierced (in three parts) per pall reversed.

In the yellow gold (Or) dexter side, one can find an open Bible inscribed with the Greek letters "Alpha" and "Omega ", side by side with an image of the Good Shepherd carrying a lamb upon his shoulders and holding a wooden staff in his right hand. A net is suspended from his right arm, its dexter (right) end spreading wide downwards. Five fishes are entangled in the net.

From the base of the blue (Azure) sinister side, a Corinthian pillar rises. It is surmounted by the white (Argent) monogram of the Blessed Virgin Mary, crowned and encircled by twelve golden stars. The symbol refers to Our Lady of Pillar, the Patroness of the home parish and diocese of origin of Cardinal Tagle. The corinthian column is used instead of the ionic column in his previous coat of arms. This corinthian column is the type of column on which the image of the Blessed Virgin in Piazza Spagna, Rome stands. The column is right in front of the Cardinal's Office as Prefect of the Congregation for the Evangelization of Peoples.

The triangular green (Vert) base of the shield is charged with a yellow gold (Or) carpenter's square superimposed on two white (Argent) lilies with stalk and leaves.

Behind the shield stands an archbishop's cross. Both are surmounted by a red (Gules) galero, with fifteen red (Gules) tassels hanging at both side of the cardinalatial headgear, arranged in 1, 2, 3, 4 and 5.

Expressed in the language of heraldry, the coat of arms is blasoned as follows:

Tierced per pall reversed Or, Azure and Vert. In dexter side, arranged in fess, an open Bible inscribed with the Greek letters Α and Ω Sable, and an image of the Good Shepherd Proper carrying a sheep upon his shoulders and holding a wooden staff Proper  in his dexter hand, a net Sable, sinister chief point suspended from the dexter arm of the Good Shepherd and the dexter fesse point to the base, five fishes Sable entangled in the net. Issuing out of the base of sinister side, a Corinthian Pillar Or surmounted by the monogram of the Blessed Virgin Mary Argent, crowned and encircled by twelve stars, all of the first. In base, a Carpenter's square Or superimposed on two lilies stalked and leaved, all of the fifth.

Behind the shield is an archepiscopal cross. Both are surmounted by a galero with fifteen tassels pendant from both sides in 1, 2, 3, 4 and 5, all Gules.

Tagle's motto is taken from the John 21:7, Dominus Est ("It is the Lord!").

Interpretation of Vatican II
Tagle served from 1995 to 2001 as one of more than 50 members of the editorial board of the five-volume, 2,500-page History of Vatican II. Completed after discussions at 14 international conferences with contributions from over 100 scholars, it is seen as the seminal work on the Second Vatican Council. It has been criticized by some conservatives for providing an overly progressive reading of the Council. Its principal editors, Alberto Melloni and Giuseppe Alberigo, are identified with the Bologna School of ecclesiastical history which views the Second Vatican Council as a "rupture" with the past, a position criticized by Pope Benedict XVI and others, who hold that Vatican II represents "continuity" with the past. Tagle's contribution, written in 1999 when he was not yet a bishop, was a 66-page chapter in the fourth volume of the History called "A November Storm: The 'Black Week'" which covered the final days of the Council's third session in 1964, when several actions by Pope Paul VI caused alarm among reform forces.

Tagle's work has been criticized from opposite viewpoints. In 2005, Archbishop Agostino Marchetto, Secretary of the Pontifical Council for the Pastoral Care of Migrants and Itinerants, a "continuity" advocate, assessed Tagle's chapter as "a rich and even comprehensive study", but called it "unbalanced, journalistic, and lacking objectivity expected of a true historian". Hans Küng, a principal critic of Pope Paul's conservative impact on the Council, endorsed Tagle's view that the Roman Curia's influence on the Pope forced the Council documents to make "theological compromises", but said Tagle was unable to develop an explanation or justification for Pope Paul's positions, so that "in the closing section his writing degenerates into sanctimoniousness".

The Vaticanologist John L. Allen Jr. reported that Cardinal Marc Ouellet, the Holy See's prefect for the Congregation for Bishops and protégé of Pope Benedict XVI, maintains his "full support" for Tagle. Allen also reported that a Vatican official indicated that he read Tagle's 1999 essay – after media reports highlighted it – and found nothing objectionable. In fact, he was impressed by Tagle's defense of Paul VI in that Tagle wrote that Paul followed a strategy of "listening to all views, especially opposing ones", and was willing to "sacrifice his personal popularity to save the council and its future". This official also said that it is difficult to suggest Tagle is opposed to Pope Benedict's reading of the council since one of the sources Tagle cited was the writings of Joseph Ratzinger. The Vatican news analyst Sandro Magister reported that Tagle's identification with the Bologna School would have hurt his chances of becoming a bishop had the members of the Congregation for Bishops – who considered Tagle's candidacy for archbishop – known of it when considering his appointment.

In a 2012 interview, Tagle maintained that the Council represented no rupture in the magisterium of the Roman Catholic Church. He added that he does not subscribe to the "rupture theory" that the Catholic Church before 1962 is disconnected from the present church.

Distinctions

Orders
 : Order of the Holy Sepulchre

Academic
 Far Eastern University:  Doctor of Humane Letters honoris causa
 San Beda College:  Doctor of Humane Letters honoris causa (March 30, 2012)
 De La Salle University–Dasmariñas: Doctor of Humane Letters honoris causa (June 19, 2013)
 Xavier University - Ateneo de Cagayan: Doctor of Humane Letters honoris causa (August 1, 2013)
 University of Santo Tomas: Doctor of Humane Letters honoris causa (August 13, 2013)
 Holy Angel University: Doctor of Humane Letters honoris causa (August 16, 2013)
 Fordham University: Doctor of Humane Letters honoris causa (March 28, 2014)
 Australian Catholic University: Doctor of Humane Letters honoris causa (May 17, 2014)
 The Catholic University of America: Doctor of Theology honoris causa (May 17, 2014)
 Catholic Theological Union: Doctor of Theology honoris causa (May 14, 2015)
 La Salle University: Doctor of Humane Letters honoris causa (September 18, 2015)

Awards
 Outstanding Manilan 2013
 Fides Award (January 26, 2015)

Television
While Archbishop of Manila, Tagle continued to perform as a host of The Word Exposed and The Faith Exposed, both Catholic television programs produced by the Jesuit Communications Foundation, which also maintains an official Facebook account for him. He is also the Tuesday presenter of Kape't Pandasal ("Coffee and Prayer", a pun on the term kape't pandesal or "coffee and salted bread"), an early morning religious inspirational program partly produced by the same network, broadcast on TV Maria, DepEd ALS, and previously on ABS-CBN.

Notes

References

Bibliography

News articles

External links

 Card. "Luis Antonio Gokim". Holy See Press Office. Archived from the original on September 4, 2017.
 Viehland, N.J. (November 5, 2012). "Elevation of Filipino archbishop considered a surprise in the Year of Faith". National Catholic Reporter.
 "The Eucharist, the Life of Christ in our Lives: Spiritual Worship and Authentic Adoration", address to the 49th International Eucharistic Congress, Quebec, June 19, 2008
 Roman Catholic Archdiocese of Manila Biography of His Eminence Luis Antonio Tagle, Archbishop of Manila (November 11, 2017 archived copy)

1957 births
21st-century Roman Catholic archbishops in the Philippines
Living people
Roman Catholic archbishops of Manila
Ateneo de Manila University alumni
Academic staff of Ateneo de Manila University
Cardinals created by Pope Benedict XVI
Officials of the Roman Curia
Filipino cardinals
Filipino people of Chinese descent
Members of the Congregation for Catholic Education
Tagalog people
Members of the Congregation for the Evangelization of Peoples
Roman Catholic bishops of Imus
Catholic University of America alumni
Members of the Order of the Holy Sepulchre
Filipino Roman Catholic theologians
Roman Catholic Archdiocese of Manila